The 1964–65 European Cup was the sixth edition of Europe's premier club handball tournament.

Knockout stage

Round 1

Round 2

|}

Quarterfinals

|}

Semifinals

|}

Finals

|}

Notes

External links 
 EHF Champions League website
 European Cup 1965 edition

EHF Champions League seasons
Champions League
Champions League